Paul Horine Wachtel (April 30, 1888 – December 15, 1964) was a pitcher in Major League Baseball. He pitched in two games for the 1917 Brooklyn Robins.

Wachtel was born in Myersville, Maryland.  He played 13 seasons in the minors in the Texas League and holds the league records for career wins (231), complete games (242), shutouts (32) and total innings pitched (3,177). He won 20 or more games six times in the Texas League and is a member of the Texas League Hall of Fame.  He died, aged 76, in San Antonio, Texas.

External links

Texas League Hall of Fame

1888 births
1964 deaths
Baseball players from Maryland
Major League Baseball pitchers
Brooklyn Robins players
Green Bay Bays players
Milwaukee Creams players
Fond du Lac Molls players
Dayton Veterans players
Muskegon Muskies players
Fort Worth Panthers players
Houston Buffaloes players
Dallas Steers players
Waco Cubs players